

Places
 Majere (village) is a village in Slovakia.

Fiction
Majere, in the fictional world of Dragonlance, may refer to:

 Raistlin Majere
 Caramon Majere
 Tika Waylan, also known as Tika Waylan Majere
 Palin Majere
 Tanin Majere
 Ulin Majere
 Sturm Majere
 Usha Majere
 Linsha Majere
 Dezra Majere
 Laura Majere